Thomas Rice Burnham (1834-1893) or T.R. Burnham was an American photographer. In the 1860s he worked in Maine with Asa Marsh Burnham as "Burnham Bros." He later moved to Boston, Massachusetts and operated from a studio on Washington Street until at least 1885. He belonged to the Boston Photographic Society and/or Boston Association of Photographers; among his contemporaries were J.W. Black, E.J. Foss, and E.F. Smith. Portrait subjects included Edwin Booth, Alvan Clark & Sons, Edw M Endicott, Clement Granch, Ulysses S. Grant, William Stevens Perry, George Antony Smalley, and Nathan and Mary Barrett Warren. Burnham showed photos in the 1876 Philadelphia Centennial Exposition and the 1887 exhibition of the Massachusetts Charitable Mechanic Association.

Notes

References

External links

 
  (includes photos by Burnham)
 
  1873-1874 (photo)
 
  (includes info related to Burnham)

American portrait photographers
1834 births
1893 deaths
Photographers from Massachusetts
Artists from Boston
Artists from Maine
19th century in Boston
19th-century American photographers